McKay Creek Power Station is one of four hydroelectric power stations in the Kiewa Hydroelectric Scheme, Victoria, Australia.

The power station is located on the slopes of Mount McKay at ground level.  The water is transported from the Rocky Valley Dam through a near vertical pipe.

Notes

Hydroelectric power stations in Victoria (Australia)